Thought So (sometimes stylized as thought so...) is the sixth studio album by Nightmares on Wax. It was released in 2008 on Warp. It peaked at number 19 on the Billboard Top Dance/Electronic Albums chart.

Critical reception

At Metacritic, which assigns a weighted average score out of 100 to reviews from mainstream critics, the album received an average score of 57, based on 6 reviews, indicating "mixed or average reviews".

Track listing

Charts

References

External links
 

2008 albums
Nightmares on Wax albums
Warp (record label) albums